Darren Fitzgerald (born 16 December 1977 in Belfast, Northern Ireland) is a Northern Irish football player who plays as a forward. He currently plays for Ards F.C. in the Irish League.

Fitzgerald played youth football for Rangers and made one appearance for the senior team.

Fitzgerald had a role as a Rangers football player in the 2000 film A Shot at Glory, which starred Ally McCoist, many of the Rangers youth and reserve players were used in the film when McCoist's team faces them in the Scottish Cup Final, other players include Derek McInnes and Claudio Reyna. Players for other teams include Owen Coyle and other low league players.

Honours

Irish Cup Winner 2001
Northern Ireland International: Under-21

References

1977 births
Living people
Association footballers from Belfast
NIFL Premiership players
Scottish Football League players
Association footballers from Northern Ireland
Rangers F.C. players
Glentoran F.C. players
Ards F.C. players
Ballymena United F.C. players
Northern Ireland under-21 international footballers
Association football forwards